Clytra novempunctata is a species of leaf beetles in the subfamily Cryptocephalinae. It can be found in Romania on the Balkan Peninsula, in southern Ukraine, the Russian Caucasus, Asia Minor and Central Asia. It has also been recorded in Italy, on the island of Sicily.

References

Beetles described in 1808
Beetles of Europe
Clytrini
Taxa named by Guillaume-Antoine Olivier